The 1924 Cork Senior Hurling Championship was the 36th staging of the Cork Senior Hurling Championship since its establishment by the Cork County Board in 1887. The championship began on 6 April 1924 and ended on 26 October 1924.

St. Finbarr’s were the defending champions.

On 26 October 1924, Blackrock won the championship following a 3-5 to 1-2 defeat of Redmonds in the final. This was their 16th championship title overall and their first title in four years.

Team changes

To Championship

Promoted from the Cork Intermediate Hurling Championship
 Mallow

Results

First round

Second round

Mallow received a bye in this round.

Semi-finals

Final

Championship statistics

Miscellaneous

 The attendance of 12,889 at the Blackrock-St. Finbarr's and Carrigtwohill-Kinsale double header was a record for a championship match.
 Redmonds qualify for the final for the first time since 1917.

References

Cork Senior Hurling Championship
Cork Senior Hurling Championship